Große Wünnow is a lake in the Mecklenburgische Seenplatte district in Mecklenburg-Vorpommern, Germany. At an elevation of 62.1 m, its surface area is 0.28 km².

Lakes of Mecklenburg-Western Pomerania